The Entomological Society of Canada or Société d’Entomologie du Canada is one of Canada's most historic scientific societies. The society was founded in Toronto on April 16, 1863. The first Council was composed of President Henry Holmes Croft (1820–1883), Secretary Treasurer William Saunders (scientist) (1836–1914), and Curator Rev. J. Hubbert. First called the Entomological Society of Ontario, which still exists as the provincial entomological society, it was initially based in London, Ontario before moving in 1906 to Guelph, Ontario. In 1950 the society adopted its present name and moved to Ottawa.

The Society has published The Canadian Entomologist since 1868, and also publishes the Bulletin of the Entomological Society of Canada since 1969. The supplement Memoirs of the Entomological Society of Canada has appeared irregularly since 1955.

References

Entomological societies
Scientific organizations based in Canada
Scientific organizations established in 1863
1863 establishments in Canada